Balikuchi is a village in Kamrup rural district, situated in north bank of river Brahmaputra.

Transport
The village is near National Highway 31 and connected to nearby towns and cities with regular buses, trekkers and other modes of transport.

See also
 Villages of Nalbari District
 Uzankuri

References

Villages in Kamrup district